The 2011–12 Villanova Wildcats men's basketball team  represented Villanova University in the 2011–12 college basketball season. Villanova was led by eleventh year head coach Jay Wright. The Wildcats participated in the Big East Conference and played their home games at The Pavilion with some select home games at the Wells Fargo Center. The Wildcats finished with a record of 13–19 overall, 5–13 in Big East play for a tie for fourteenth-place finish, Wright's worst season at Nova and the only Nova team coach by Wright that would not play in any of the post-season tournaments. They lost in the 2nd round in the 2012 Big East men's basketball tournament to South Florida. They were not invited to a postseason tournament for the first time since 1998, leading to some speculation that Wright's job might be jeopardy.

Roster

Rankings

Schedule

|-
!colspan=9| Exhibition

|-
!colspan=9| Regular season

|-
!colspan=9| Big East tournament

References

Villanova Wildcats
Villanova Wildcats men's basketball seasons